Dr Ján Ladislav Nádaši-Jégé (12 February 1866, in Dolný Kubín – 2 July 1940, in Dolný Kubín) was a Slovak writer, literary critic and doctor.

Life
He was born into a lawyer's family in Dolný Kubín, and studied in Kežmarok, Ružomberok, Gyöngyös and Levoča. After leaving exams in Levoča he started to study medicine in Prague. He planned to leave for Cleveland in the United States, however, family problems changed his plans. He settled as a doctor in Dolný Kubín, where, with the exception of 1924–25, when he lived in Bratislava, lived his almost whole life. Jégé died in 1940 due to heart attack.

Works
He started writing during his studies in Prague. At that time, he was a member of the Detvan association, which supported his literary activities. Under the pseudonym Ján Grob (from initials comes his pseudonym Jégé) he wrote several sketches and one novella. Most of his works, however, come from the 1930s and particularly 1920s, when he wrote his best works.

 1897 - Pomsta ("Revenge"), tale
 1889 - Výhody spoločenského života ("Advantages of the social life"), novella
 1922 - Wieniawského legenda ("Wieniawski's legend"), historical novel
 1923 - Adam Šangala, historical novel
 1925 - Krpčeky sv. Floriána ("St. Florian's little boots"), drama
 1925 - Mia, drama
 1925 - Kuruci, ("Kuruc"), novella
 1926 - Magister rytier Donč ("Knight Donč the Magister"),  novella
 1926 - Horymír, novella
 1928 - Svätopluk, novel
 1930 - Cesta životom ("A way through the life"), autobiographical work
 1931 - Itália ("Italy"), collection of novellas
 1931 - Kozinský mlyn ("Mill of Kozin"), novella
 1932 - Alina Orságová, novel
 1934 - Medzi nimi ("Between them"), collection of novellas
 1937 - S duchom času ("With the spirit of time/Zeitgeist"), novel

References
Peter Petro. History of Slovak Literature. McGill-Queens University Press, 1997. ; pp. 121–123

External links
Ladislav Nádaši-Jégé 

1866 births
1940 deaths
Slovak writers
People from Dolný Kubín